Thomas Edwards (January 14, 1701 - September 14, 1755) was a prominent silversmith active in colonial Boston, Massachusetts. He was a son of silversmith John Edwards, and advertised in the Boston Weekly News-Letter, May 18, 1746, that he would carry on his father's business "at the shop of the deceased." His younger brother, Samuel Edwards, was also a silversmith, as was his son, Joseph Edwards Jr. Edwards served over time as Third Sergeant (1729), Ensign (1747), Lieutenant (1750), and Captain (1753) of the Ancient and Honorable Artillery Company of Massachusetts. His work is collected in the Museum of Fine Arts, Boston, Brooklyn Museum, and Winterthur Museum.

References 
 American Church Silver of the Seventeenth and Eighteenth Centuries: With a Few Pieces of Domestic Plate, Exhibited at the Museum of Fine Arts, July to December, 1911, Museum of Fine Arts, Boston, 1911, pages 53–54.
 American silver at Winterthur, Ian M. G. Quimby, Dianne Johnson, Henry Francis du Pont Winterthur Museum, 1995, page 103.
 American Silversmiths
 Zachariah Brigden Papers. General Collection, Beinecke Rare Book and Manuscript Library.

1701 births
1755 deaths
People from Boston
Military personnel from Massachusetts
American silversmiths